is an arcade baseball game released by Taito in 1991. The game is played under normal baseball rules with the exception being that players can charge themselves up to attempt a better hit or pitch.

The game was re-released as part of Taito Memories in 2005.

External links
Ah Eikou no Koshien at Arcade History

1991 video games
Arcade video games
Baseball video games
Taito arcade games
Japan-exclusive video games
Video games developed in Japan